Amnon Shashua (born May 26, 1960) is an Israeli computer scientist and businessman. Shashua is the Sachs Professor of Computer Science at the Hebrew University of Jerusalem, the President and Chief Executive Officer (CEO) of the autonomous driving and  driver-assistance technology company Mobileye, Co-Founder of the artificial vision devices company OrCam, Founder and Owner of One Zero Digital Bank and Chairman of the artificial intelligence company AI21 Labs.

Biography
Amnon Shashua received his B.Sc in mathematics and computer science from Tel-Aviv University in 1985 and his M.Sc in computer science in 1989 from the Weizmann Institute of Science under the supervision of Shimon Ullman. His Ph.D in brain and cognitive sciences was received from the Massachusetts Institute of Technology (MIT), while working at the Artificial Intelligence Laboratory, in 1993; and his postdoctoral training under Tomaso Poggio at the center for biological and computational learning at MIT.

Career

Academic
Shashua has been on the computer science faculty at the Hebrew University of Jerusalem since 1996. In 1999 he was appointed as an associate professor and in 2003 received full professorship. From 2002 to 2005 he was the head of the engineering and computer science school at the Hebrew University. Shashua has held the Sachs chair in computer science at the Hebrew University since 2007.

Shashua's work includes early visual processing of saliency and grouping mechanisms, visual recognition and learning, image synthesis for animation and graphics, theory of computer vision in the areas of multiple-view geometry and multi-view tensors, multilinear algebraic systems in vision and learning, primal/dual optimization for approximate inference in MRF and Graphical models, and (since 2014) deep layered networks.

Business
In 1995, Shashua founded CogniTens, which was sold to Hexagon AB in 2007. In 1999, Shashua co-founded Mobileye, a company that develops systems-on-chip and computer vision algorithms for driving assistance systems, as well as autonomous driving technology. On August 1, 2014 Mobileye launched its IPO on the NYSE which was the biggest Israeli IPO ever in the US raising approximately $1 billion at a market cap of $5.3 billion.

In 2010, Shashua co-founded OrCam, an Israeli company which launched an assistive device for the visually impaired based on computer vision capabilities.

In August 2017, Intel acquired Mobileye for approximately $15.3 billion. Shashua became a senior vice president at Intel, in addition to his title of President and CEO of Mobileye. In 2017, he also co-founded AI21 Labs.

In October 2022, Mobileye went public again, trading on the Nasdaq Stock Exchange with Shashua as its CEO.

Awards and recognition
Shashua received first prize in the 2004 Kaye Innovation award, and the 2005 Mifal HaPayis Landau Prize for Science and Research in the area of Exact Sciences - Robotics.

On Israeli Independence Day 2017, Shashua was chosen to light a torch at the national ceremony on Mt. Herzl.

In 2019, Shashua was recognized by the Society for Imaging Science and Technology as the Electronic Imaging (EI) Scientist of the Year.

In 2020, he was awarded the Dan David Prize for his work in Artificial Intelligence.

In 2022, he was awarded the Mobility Innovator Award and was inducted into The Automotive Hall of Fame.

In 2023, he was awarded MotorTrend's first Software-Defined Vehicle Innovator (SDVI) Award.

References

External links
Amnon Shashua, academic page on Hebrew University of Jerusalem website.
Amnon Shashua, One of the top 10 successful people of 2014, according to Calcalist.

1960 births
Living people
Israeli Mizrahi Jews
Artificial intelligence researchers
Academic staff of the Hebrew University of Jerusalem
Intel people
Israeli chief executives
Israeli company founders
Israeli computer scientists
Massachusetts Institute of Technology School of Science alumni
Tel Aviv University alumni
Weizmann Institute of Science alumni